3 (Tre) is a 1996 Italian comedy film directed by Christian De Sica.

Cast
Christian De Sica as Jacopo Del Serchio
Anna Galiena as Chiara Del Serchio
 as Leonardo
Leo Gullotta as the Bishop of Pisa
Francesco De Angelis as Leonardo Del Serchio
Carlo Monni as Pietro
Nicoletta Boris as Pietro's wife
 as Chiara

References

External links

1996 films
Films directed by Christian De Sica
Films scored by Manuel De Sica
1990s Italian-language films
1996 comedy films
Italian comedy films
1990s Italian films